Lulua may refer to:
 Lulua (beetle), a genus of beetles in the subfamily Prioninae
 Lulua River
 Lulua District
 Lulua Province (proposed)
 Lulua Province (former)
 Lulua Mosque, Egypt
 Lulua people